Rilmazafone (リスミー, Rhythmy, previously known as 450191-S) is a water-soluble prodrug developed in Japan. Once metabolized, rilmazafone is converted into several benzodiazepine metabolites that have sedative and hypnotic effects. These metabolites induce impairment of motor function and have hypnotic properties.

Rilmazafone is not a benzodiazepine, since there is no benzene ring fused with a diazepine ring in the compound; in fact, the parent drug has no diazepine ring.  It is therefore not classified as a benzodiazepine in several countries, including the United States, where it is not designated a controlled substance.  Rilmazafone has no effects on benzodiazepine receptors itself, nor does it produce any psychoactive effects prior to metabolism.  However, once inside the body it is metabolized by aminopeptidase enzymes in the small intestine to form the principal active benzodiazepine 8-chloro-6-(2-chlorophenyl)-N,N-dimethyl-4H-1,2,4-triazolo [1,5-a][1,4]benzodiazepine-2-carboxamide.  As can be seen in the molecular diagram below, the principal metabolite contains a benzodiazepine ring structure (i.e., a benzene ring fused with a diazepine ring), unlike the parent compound (rilmazafone), which has no diazepine ring.

See also 
 Rilmazolam
 Avizafone
 Alprazolam triazolobenzophenone
 GL-II-73

References

External links 
 
 Drug Information Sheet

Acetamides
2-Aminobenzophenones
Chlorobenzenes
GABAA receptor positive allosteric modulators
Japanese inventions
Benzodiazepine prodrugs
Triazoles